Cry Murder is a 1950 American crime film directed by Jack Glenn and written by James Carhardt and Nicholas Winter. The film stars Carole Mathews, Jack Lord, Howard Smith, Hope Miller, Tom Pedi and Eugene Smith. The film was released on January 6, 1950 by Film Classics.

Plot

Cast          
Carole Mathews as Norma Wayne Alden
Jack Lord as Tommy Warren
Howard Smith as Senator Alden
Hope Miller as Rosa Santorre
Tom Pedi as Santorre
Eugene Smith as Michael Alden
Harry Clark as Joe
Tom Ahearne as Phillips
William Gibberson as Blair
William Dwyer as Patrolman
Lionel MacLyn as Sergeant

References

External links
 

1950 films
1950s English-language films
American crime films
1950 crime films
Film Classics films
American black-and-white films
1950s American films